Black Mail is a 1985 Indian Malayalam film, directed by Crossbelt Mani and produced by Ratheesh and Sathar. The film stars Ratheesh, Sathaar, Anuradha and Kuthiravattam Pappu in the lead roles. The film has musical score by Guna Singh.

Cast
Ratheesh as SI Vijayan
Balan K. Nair as Mooppan 
Sathaar as Suresh
Anuradha as Malu
Kuthiravattam Pappu as Thankayyan
Mala Aravindan as Manikyam
Jayamalini as Malini
Ramu as Rajesh
Kundara Johnny as Johnny
Ravi Menon as Jambu
Hari as D.I.G.
Kaduvakulam Antony as Kelu
Madhuri as Chembakam
Nellikode Bhaskaran as Chembakaraman Thampi
Santo Krishnan as Aadivasi

Soundtrack
The music was composed by Guna Singh and the lyrics were written by Bharanikkavu Sivakumar.

References

External links
 

1985 films
1980s Malayalam-language films